Charles Musgrave Harvey (11 May 1837 – 2 November 1917) was an English first-class cricketer and clergyman.

The son of The Reverend Richard Harvey, he was born at Hornsey in May 1837. He was educated at Charterhouse School, before going up to Christ Church, Oxford. While studying at Oxford, he made a single appearance in first-class cricket for Oxford University against the Marylebone Cricket Club (MCC) at Oxford in 1858. The following year, he made one first-class appearance apiece for the MCC against Oxford University, and for Middlesex against Kent. He made two further first-class appearances for the Gentlemen of the South against the Gentlemen of the North in 1860. In five first-class matches, he scored 111 runs at an average of 15.85 and with a high score of 36. 

After graduating from Oxford, Harvey took holy orders in the Church of England. His first ecclesiastical post was at Halstead, where he curate from 1860–63. He was appointed curate at Hampstead in 1864, a post he held until 1869. He became the curate at Acton in 1869. He was later vicar at Hillingdon and was a prebendary of St Paul's Cathedral. Harvey died at Ealing in November 1917. He had married  Frances Harriet Brewster in August 1863, with the couple having eight children. Notable children included Sir John Harvey, who served on the Supreme Court of New South Wales, Richard Harvey, who was an Archdeacon, and Sir Ernest Harvey, who was Chief Cashier of the Bank of England.

References

External links

1837 births
1917 deaths
People from Hornsey
People educated at Charterhouse School
Alumni of Christ Church, Oxford
English cricketers
Oxford University cricketers
Marylebone Cricket Club cricketers
Middlesex cricketers
Gentlemen of the South cricketers
19th-century English Anglican priests
20th-century English Anglican priests